Palace Super Falcons is a South African women's association football club.

Palace Group formed Palace Super Falcons Women's Academy in 2002. Aiming to develop women soccer and young girls socially and to decrease their involvement in criminal activity, substance abuse and other social ill by participating in sport. The Palace Group also has a youth academy which provided for junior players from previously disadvantaged backgrounds in townships around Midrand. Both senior and junior players are actively participating in competitive women's football competitions around South Africa.

Palace Super Falcons won the 2009–10 Sasol Women's League National Championships beating defending champions, Detroit Ladies, 4–2 in a penalty shoot-out after the score being 2–2 at full time. The match was broadcast on SABC 1 in Seshego, Limpopo on the 23 May 2010. It was attended by football personalities like Doctor Khumalo and the President of SAFA, Kirsten Nematandani.

References

Association football clubs established in 2002
Soccer clubs in Gauteng
2002 establishments in South Africa
Ekurhuleni